John "Johnny" Bairos (born November 8, 1977) is an American cyclist. He competed at the 2000 Summer Olympics in Sydney, in the men's team sprint. Bairos was born in Anaheim, California.

References

1977 births
Living people
American male cyclists
Olympic cyclists of the United States
Cyclists at the 2000 Summer Olympics